Tsang Wai Chung is a former Hong Kong professional footballer and he was head coach of South China and Hong Kong national football team.

On 17 September 2008, Tsang asked to leave due to health reasons. He temporarily left the responsibility of head coach and worked as team adviser. Assistant coach Liu Chun Fai took up the responsibility to take care of the team.

In his playing career, he played for Caroline Hill, Sea Bee, Eastern, Tsuen Wan, Lai Sun and Sing Tao.

After he retired, he coached Sing Tao, Eastern and the Hong Kong national football team.

He holds an AFC Grade A Coach licence.

Currently, he is the Futsal Manager of HKFA.

Coached Record

Games of Hong Kong national football team

Games of Hong Kong U-23

Games of Hong Kong League XI

References

Hong Kong footballers
Eastern Sports Club footballers
South China AA managers
Hong Kong national football team managers
Hong Kong football managers
Living people
Hong Kong First Division League players
1960 births
Eastern Sports Club football managers
Hong Kong international footballers
Association football midfielders
Association football forwards